Lunna Holm is a small island near Lunna Ness (Mainland, Shetland), in the Shetland Islands.

Lighthouse
Lunna Holm Lighthouse is an active lighthouse located on Lunna Holm at the east entrance of Yell Sound. It was built in 1985 in fiberglass, it is fully automated and run by solar power; it emits three white, red or green flashes every 15 seconds depending from the direction.

See also

 List of lighthouses in Scotland
 List of Northern Lighthouse Board lighthouses

References

External links

 Shetlopedia
 Northern Lighthouse Board 

Uninhabited islands of Shetland